A list of films produced in Pakistan in 1952 (see 1952 in film) and in the Urdu language:

1952

See also
1952 in Pakistan

External links
 Search Pakistani film - IMDB.com

1952
Pakistani
Films